Mangalagiri Sriranjani, better known as Sriranjani senior (1906–1939), was a Telugu theatre and film actress and singer. She is the elder sister of actress Sriranjani (junior) and mother of director M. Mallikharjuna Rao.

She was born in Murikipudi in Narasaraopet Taluk Andhra Pradesh in 1939.

She made her début in Telugu cinema in 1934 with Lava Kusha (1934) directed by C. Pullayya. She then appeared in Shri Krishna Leelalu (1935) and Mayabazaar (1936).

Filmography
 Vande Mataram (1939)
 Vara Vikrayam (1939)
Bhakta Markandeya (1938)
 Sarangadhara (1937) (actor and singer)
 Sasirekha Parinayam (1936)
 Sati Tulasi (1936)
 Sri Krishna Leelalu (1935)
 Silver King (1935)
 Lava Kusa (1934)

References
 Nata Ratnalu, Mikkilineni Radhakrishna Murthy, Second edition, 2002.
 Luminaries of 20th Century, Potti Sreeramulu Telugu University, 2005.

External links
 

Actresses in Telugu cinema
Telugu actresses
Indian stage actresses
1906 births
1939 deaths
Indian film actresses
20th-century Indian actresses
Indian women playback singers
Singers from Andhra Pradesh
20th-century Indian singers
Actresses from Andhra Pradesh
Actresses in Telugu theatre
20th-century Indian women singers
Film musicians from Andhra Pradesh
Women musicians from Andhra Pradesh